Archbishop Franc Kramberger (born 7 October 1936) is a Slovenian Roman Catholic prelate who served as a Bishop of the Diocese of Maribor from 6 November 1980 until 7 April 2006 and as an Archbishop of the newly elevated Archdiocese of Maribor since 7 April 2006 until his resignation on 3 February 2011.

Education
Archbishop Kramberger was born into a Roman Catholic family in the Slovene Hills in the present day Municipality of Lenart.

After finishing primary school, which he attended in his native town and graduation a classical gymnasium #1 in Maribor in 1954, he was admitted to the Major Theological Seminary in Ljubljana and in the same time joined the Theological Faculty at the University of Ljubljana, where he studied from 1954 until 1960 and was ordained as priest on June 29, 1960 for the Roman Catholic Diocese of Lavant (as in this time was named the Diocese of Maribor), after completed his philosophical and theological studies.

Pastoral and educational work
After his ordination Fr. Kramberger served as a chaplain in the parish of the Most Holy Body in Maribor (1960–1965) and after that as  a prefect in the Slomšek Minor Seminary in Maribor (1965–1972) and the Director of this educational institute (1972–1980).

In the same time he continued his postgraduate studies at the University of Ljubljana with a Doctor of Theology degree in 1973.

Prelate
On November 6, 1980, he was appointed by Pope John Paul II as the Diocesan Bishop of the Roman Catholic Diocese of Maribor. On December 21, 1980, he was consecrated as bishop by Apostolic Pro-nuncio to Yugoslavia, Archbishop Michele Cecchini and other prelates of the Roman Catholic Church in the Cathedral of Saint John the Baptist in Maribor. On April 7, 2006, Pope Benedict XVI erected three new dioceses in Slovenia: in Celje, Murska Sobota and in Novo Mesto, and elevated the former diocese of Maribor to the archdiocese and metropolis status. Mons. Kramberger became the first Archbishop of the newly elevated Archdiocese of Maribor.

The several terms he served as the Vice-President of the Episcopal Conference of Slovenia and from December 6, 2004 until March 16, 2007 was its President.

He resigned on February 3, 2011, citing his approaching 75 years of age as the reason for the resignation. The archdiocese was in serious financial difficulties at the time.

References

1936 births
Living people
People from the Municipality of Lenart
University of Ljubljana alumni
20th-century Roman Catholic bishops in Slovenia
21st-century Roman Catholic archbishops in Slovenia
Slovenian Roman Catholic archbishops
20th-century Slovenian Roman Catholic priests
Bishops appointed by Pope John Paul II